The 1990 Western Michigan Broncos football team represented Western Michigan University in the Mid-American Conference (MAC) during the 1990 NCAA Division I-A football season.  In their fourth season under head coach Al Molde, the Broncos compiled a 7–4 record (5–3 against MAC opponents), finished in third place in the MAC, and outscored their opponents, 249 to 218.  The team played its home games at Waldo Stadium in Kalamazoo, Michigan.

The team's statistical leaders included Brad Tayles with 2,397 passing yards, Corey Sylve with 840 rushing yards, and Allan Boyko with 792 receiving yards.  Linebacker Sean Mulhearn was selected as the MAC defensive player of the year.

Schedule

References

Western Michigan
Western Michigan Broncos football seasons
Western Michigan Broncos football